The Centenary Cup was a Gaelic Games competition arranged by the Gaelic Athletic Association to mark the centenary of the GAA in 1984. This was followed by the similar, but less popular Open Draw in 1985.

The hurling competition was won by Cork and the football competition was won by Meath.

Hurling

Football

Gaelic football competitions in Ireland
1984 in Gaelic football
Hurling competitions in Ireland
1984 in hurling